|}

The Melling Chase, currently known for sponsorship purposes as the Marsh Chase, is a Grade 1 National Hunt steeplechase in Great Britain which is open to horses aged five years or older. It is run at Aintree over a distance of about 2 miles and 4 furlongs (4,023 metres), and during its running there are sixteen fences to be jumped. The race is scheduled to take place each year in early April.

The event is named after Melling, a nearby village which is made famous by Melling Road, a public road which crosses the racecourse. It was established in 1991, and it has held Grade 1 status throughout its history. The race is currently staged on the second day of the three-day Grand National meeting.

The field often includes horses which ran in the Queen Mother Champion Chase or the Ryanair Chase at the previous month's Cheltenham Festival.

Records
Most successful horse (2 wins):
 Viking Flagship – 1995, 1996
 Direct Route – 1999, 2000
 Native Upmanship – 2002, 2003
 Moscow Flyer – 2004, 2005
 Voy Por Ustedes – 2008, 2009
 Fakir D'oudairies - 2021, 2022

Leading jockey (4 wins):
 Barry Geraghty – Moscow Flyer (2004, 2005), Finian's Rainbow (2012), Sprinter Sacre (2013)

Leading trainer (3 wins):

 Nicky Henderson -Remittance Man (1992), Finian's Rainbow (2012), Sprinter Sacre (2013)
 Paul Nicholls – Fadalko (2001), Master Minded (2011), Politologue (2018)

Winners

See also
 Horse racing in Great Britain
 List of British National Hunt races

References

 Racing Post:
 

 aintree.co.uk – 2010 John Smith's Grand National Media Guide.
 pedigreequery.com – Melling Chase – Aintree.

External links
 Race Recordings 

National Hunt races in Great Britain
Aintree Racecourse
National Hunt chases
Recurring sporting events established in 1991
1991 establishments in England